Gipfelstürmer (German for Summit Conquerors) is the ninth album by the Neue Deutsche Härte band Unheilig, which was released on 12 December 2014.

Track listing

Limited Deluxe Edition Track Listing

Charts

Weekly charts

Weekly charts

Certifications and sales

References

Unheilig albums
2014 albums